Nematullo Asranqulov (also Nematullo Asronkulov, ; born 1 April 1982 in Rudaki) is a Tajikistani judoka, who played for the middleweight category. He won a silver medal for his division at the 2007 Asian Judo Championships in Kuwait City, Kuwait, losing out to South Korea's Choi Sun-Ho.

Asranqulov represented Tajikistan at the 2008 Summer Olympics in Beijing, where he competed for the men's middleweight class (90 kg). Unfortunately, he lost the first preliminary round match, by a yuko and a kuchiki taoshi (single leg takedown), to Azerbaijan's Elkhan Mammadov.

References

External links

NBC 2008 Olympics profile

Tajikistani male judoka
Living people
People from Districts of Republican Subordination
Olympic judoka of Tajikistan
Judoka at the 2008 Summer Olympics
1982 births
Judoka at the 2006 Asian Games
Asian Games competitors for Tajikistan